Bembidion versicolor is a species of beetle in the family Carabidae. It is found on Saint Pierre and Miquelon, as well as in Canada and the United States.

References

Further reading

 
 
 

versicolor
Beetles described in 1847
Beetles of North America
Taxa named by John Lawrence LeConte